Laurentian (French: Laurentides or Laurentien) may refer to:

Relation to Saint Lawrence

Geography
North America
Laurentide Ice Sheet, the continental glacier covering much of North America during the Pleistocene Epoch
Relating to the Saint Lawrence River

Canada
Laurentia, the craton at the heart of the North American continent
Canadian Shield, also known as the Laurentian Shield or the Laurentian Plateau.
Laurentian Divide, also known as the "Northern Divide", a continental divide in North America
Laurentian Mountains in Quebec
Laurentian Upland
Laurentian Abyss or Abyssal – a trench off the eastern coast of Canada
Laurentides, administrative region in Quebec
Laurentides Wildlife Reserve, in Quebec
Saint-Lin–Laurentides, a municipality in Quebec
Laurentien (Quebec City) (in French: quartier "Notre-Dame-des-Laurentides"), a borough in Quebec City, Quebec
Laurentian, Ontario, a neighbourhood within Valley East, Ontario

Other
Laurentian University in Sudbury, Ontario
Laurentian Bank of Canada
Laurentian language, a language in the Iroquoian family of languages
Laurentian French, the variety of the French language spoken in Canada
Laurentian Codex, a Russian manuscript
Laurentian library or Biblioteca Medicea Laurenziana of Florence, Italy
Laurentian (train), operated by the Delaware & Hudson
Princess Laurentien of the Netherlands, member of the Dutch royal family
Laurentien (art supplies), a Canadian brand of art supplies
Laurentian Society, a student society of Trinity College, Dublin University
Laurentian Consensus, a Canadian political theory

See also
 Laurentia (disambiguation)
 Lawrencian, relating to English writer and poet D. H. Lawrence